Anasa repetita is a species of leaf-footed bug in the family Coreidae. It is found in North America.

References

External links

 

Articles created by Qbugbot
Insects described in 1905
Coreini